The tenth Central American and Caribbean Games were held in San Juan, Puerto Rico, from July 11 to July 25, 1966. These games were one of the largest ever with a total number of 1,689 athletes from eighteen participating nations.

Organizing Committee
Among those that composed the organizing committee were; Emilio Huyke, President, Joaco Martinez Rousset, General Secretary, Felicio Torregrosa Teknical Directo, German Rieckhoff Sampayo, Legal Council, Jose Luis Purcell, Emilio Vergne, Rafael Aparicio, Luis Crespo, Juan Maldonado, Rafell Pont Flores, Norman H. Davila and others.

Sports

References

 Meta
 

 
Central American and Caribbean Games, 1966
Central American and Caribbean Games
Central American and Caribbean Games, 1966
Central American And Caribbean Games, 1966
1966 in Caribbean sport
1966 in Central American sport
Multi-sport events in Puerto Rico
20th century in San Juan, Puerto Rico